Knut Bengtson (3 June 1919 – 7 May 1976) was a Norwegian sailor who competed in the 1948 Summer Olympics and in the 1964 Summer Olympics.

References

1919 births
1976 deaths
Norwegian male sailors (sport)
Olympic sailors of Norway
Sailors at the 1948 Summer Olympics – Swallow
Sailors at the 1964 Summer Olympics – Dragon